"A-Yo" is a song by American hip hop duo Method Man & Redman, released on March 31, 2009, as the first single from their third studio album, Blackout! 2 (2009). The song was produced by Pete Rock and features vocals from Canadian rapper Saukrates. A video for the song was released on April 9, 2009. The song contains a sample of "Magic Mona", as performed by Phyllis Hyman.

Charts

References 

2009 singles
Song recordings produced by Pete Rock
Method Man songs
Redman (rapper) songs
Def Jam Recordings singles
Songs written by Method Man
2009 songs
Songs written by Redman (rapper)
Songs written by Pete Rock